In the Place of Fallen Leaves is Tim Pears's debut novel, published in 1993.  It won the Ruth Hadden Memorial Award in 1993 and the Hawthornden Prize in 1994.

Inspiration
On his website, Tim Pears reveals that the novel is set in the Devon village where he grew up (Trusham on the edge of Dartmoor) He had written many 'appalling' poems in his twenties then adapted one into a story; this liberated him and he never wrote another poem; just stories which eventually became this, his first novel. He cites his other influences as Gabriel Garcia Marquez’s One Hundred Years of Solitude, Marc Chagall’s paintings of the Russian Pale, Mikhail Sholokhov’s tales of Don Cossacks, and New Zealander Vincent Ward’s film Vigil.

Plot introduction
It is set in the long, hot summer of 1984 in an isolated Devon village on the edge of Dartmoor where thirteen-year-old Alison is growing up, the youngest member of a farming family. The story covers scenes from Alison's own life as well as those of her neighbours, siblings, parents and grandparents.

Reception
"By turns elegiac, moving and extremely funny, Pears is also unafraid to muscle up his formidable powers of Proustian evocation. An extraordinarily promising debut" - Time Out
"Reminiscent of Faulkner and Garcia Marquez, the writing retains a very English scale ... A triumph ... Sensitive, heart-warming and hallucunatory." - Financial Times
"In the Place of Fallen Leaves is more perfect than any first novel deserves to be." - The Observer

References

External links

1993 British novels
Novels set in Devon
Fiction set in 1984
Family saga novels
English novels
Hamish Hamilton books
Hawthornden Prize-winning works
1993 debut novels